St Michael's Church is a Grade II* listed Gothic Victorian church in Bournemouth, Dorset, England.

History 
The church was built in 1875 and was consecrated on 20 January 1876. The nave was designed by Richard Norman Shaw. Along with St Swithun's Church, St Michael's was one of the towns two central churches.

In 2021, the church was renamed St Mike's to attract younger generations.

Gallery

References

External links 

 Church website

See also 

 List of churches in Bournemouth

Diocese of Winchester
Churches completed in 1875
1875 establishments in England
Churches in Bournemouth
Grade II listed churches in Dorset
Gothic Revival architecture in Dorset
Gothic Revival church buildings in England
Church of England church buildings in Dorset